Eyal Tartazky (Hebrew:אייל טרטצקי ;born September 13, 1977) is a former Israeli footballer.

Career

Tartazky began his career in the youth club of Hapoel Haifa and flighted to the elder team in 1998. In the season 1998/99 won the championship with Hapoel Haifa.

In 2000, he moved to Maccabi Herzliya, and he returned to Hapoel Haifa in 2002. Tartazky returned to Maccabi Herzliya in 2003.

Tartazky was a captain of Maccabi Herzliya in the years 2003–2007. In the season 2006/07 Tartazky won the Toto Cup with Maccabi Herzliya.

In 2007 Tartazky returned to Hapoel Haifa, where he also captain.

Honours
Israeli Premier League:
Winner (1): 1998–99
Toto Cup:
Winner (1): 2006–07

External links
Eyal Tartazky – Red
Player pag – Red Volcano
Player pag – Hapoel Haifa

1977 births
Living people
Hapoel Haifa F.C. players
Maccabi Herzliya F.C. players
F.C. Haifa Robi Shapira players
Israeli Premier League players
Liga Leumit players
Footballers from Haifa
Israeli footballers
Association football defenders